Turan's minnow (Pseudophoxinus turani) is a species of ray-finned fish in the family Cyprinidae. It is endemic to Incesu Spring in the Orontes River drainage in Turkey.

References

Pseudophoxinus
Endemic fauna of Turkey
Fish described in 2014